Leri Khabelov  (born 5 July 1964) is a Georgian politician and a retired wrestler, formerly a Soviet Olympic champion in Freestyle wrestling. In 2012, he was elected to the Parliament of Georgia on a ticket of the Georgian Dream party.

Sport career
An ethnic Ossetian, Leri Khabelov was born in Tbilisi, then-Soviet Georgia in 1964. His achievements included being the Champion of the XXV Olympic Games (1992 Barcelona), second-prize winner of the XXIV Olympic Games (1988 Seoul), five-fold World Champion (1985, 1987, 1990, 1991, 1993) and third-prize winner (1995), four-fold European Champion (1985, 1987, 1988, 1992), winner of the World Cup (1991), World Champion among boys (1982)and youths (1983), three-fold Champion of the USSR (1985, 1987, 1988), Champion of the IX USSR Peoples Spartaciads (1986). From 1993 to 1996, he contested for the Russian Federation. For his contribution to the sports, he has been granted the title of Honored Master of Sports by the Soviet Union and the Vakhtang Gorgasali Order, 2nd Class, and the Order of Honor by Georgia. He has been a vice-president of the Georgian National Olympic Committee from 2000 to 2007 and deputy chairman of the Sports Department of Georgia from 1998 to 2004. Khabelov is the President of the Georgian National Olympic Association and National Olympians Association.

Political career
Leri Khabelov became involved in the Georgian politics in 2008, when he ran, unsuccessfully, in the parliamentary election on a ticket of the opposition Republican Party of Georgia . In 2012, he joined the new opposition party Georgian Dream spearheaded by the tycoon Bidzina Ivanishvili. He was elected to the Parliament in the October 1, 2012 election and became a chairman of the parliamentary Committee for Sport and Youth Affairs on October 21, 2012.

References

External links
 

1964 births
Living people
Sportspeople from Tbilisi
Soviet male sport wrestlers
Olympic wrestlers of the Soviet Union
Olympic wrestlers of the Unified Team
Olympic wrestlers of Russia
Wrestlers at the 1988 Summer Olympics
Wrestlers at the 1992 Summer Olympics
Wrestlers at the 1996 Summer Olympics
Russian male sport wrestlers
Olympic gold medalists for the Unified Team
Olympic silver medalists for the Soviet Union
Olympic medalists in wrestling
Members of the Parliament of Georgia
Georgian Dream politicians
Ossetian people
World Wrestling Championships medalists
Medalists at the 1992 Summer Olympics
Medalists at the 1988 Summer Olympics
Recipients of the Presidential Order of Excellence
World Wrestling Champions